Sopik is a settlement in Gjirokastër County, southeastern Albania. It is part of the former commune of Pogon. After the 2015 local government reform, it became part of the municipality of Dropull. A secondary border crossing point with Greece is situated near Sopik. According to a 2014 report by the Albanian government, there were 670 ethnic Greeks in the village.

References

Populated places in Dropull
Albania–Greece border crossings
Greek communities in Albania